Sedevacantism is a doctrinal position within traditionalist Catholicism, which holds that the present occupier of the Holy See is not a valid pope due to the "Pope's" espousal of one or more heresies and that, for lack of a valid pope, the See of Rome is vacant.

The term sedevacantism is derived from the Latin phrase sede vacante, which means "with the chair [i.e. of the Bishop of Rome] being vacant". The phrase is commonly used to refer specifically to a vacancy of the Holy See from the Pope's death or  resignation, to the election of his successor.

Among sedevacantists, some chose to end the vacancy in the Holy See by electing their own pope; hence, they are more appropriately called conclavists.

The number of sedevacantists is unknown and difficult to measure; estimates range from tens of thousands to hundreds of thousands.

Positions

Origin 
Sedevacantism owes its origins to the rejection of the theological and disciplinary changes implemented following the Second Vatican Council (1962–65). Sedevacantists reject this Council, on the basis of their interpretation of its documents on ecumenism and religious liberty, among others, which they see as contradicting the traditional teachings of the Catholic Church and as denying the unique mission of Catholicism as the one true religion, outside of which there is no salvation. They also say that new disciplinary norms, such as the Mass of Paul VI, promulgated on 3 April 1969, undermine or conflict with the historical Catholic faith and are deemed blasphemous, while post-Vatican II teachings, particularly those related to ecumenism, are labelled heresies. They conclude, on the basis of their rejection of the revised Mass rite and of postconciliar church teaching as false, that the popes involved are also false. Among even traditionalist Catholics, this is a quite divisive question.

Traditionalist Catholics other than sedevacantists recognize as legitimate the line of popes leading to and including Pope Francis. Sedevacantists, however, claim that the infallible Magisterium of the Catholic Church could not have decreed the changes made in the name of the Second Vatican Council, and conclude that those who issued these changes could not have been acting with the authority of the Catholic Church. Accordingly, they hold that Pope John XXIII and his successors left the true Catholic Church and thus lost legitimate authority in the church. A formal heretic, they say, cannot be the Catholic pope.

Justification 
While Sedevacantists' arguments often hinge on their interpretation of modernism as being a heresy, this is also debated.

Positions within sedevacantism

On clergy, Mass, and sacraments 
Some sedevacantists accept the consecrations and ordinations of sedevacantist bishops and priests, and the offering of Masses and the administration of sacraments by the said bishops and priests, to be licit because of epikea, i.e. "the interpretation of the mind and will of him who made the law". In this case, the ecclesiastical laws (e.g. prohibition of consecrations of bishops without papal mandate; prohibition of administration of sacraments without ecclesiastical authorization) are interpreted to cease when to follow them would be impossible, harmful, or unreasonable, or would mean transgressing divine laws (e.g. the church must have bishops and priests; Catholics must attend Mass and receive the sacraments), and because of a historical precedent for consecrating Catholic bishops during a long vacancy of the Holy See.

On liturgy 
Another divisive question among sedevacantists is whether it is permissible to go to "una cum" masses (Traditional Latin Masses where the name of the person considered by mainstream Catholics as Pope is spoken in the Roman Canon, specifically in the "Te igitur" prayer, where the priest says "una cum famulo tuo Papa nostro N". ["together with Thy Servant N., our Pope"]). Such "una cum" masses are offered by the priests of the Priestly Fraternity of Saint Peter. Some argue that it is, or may be, permissible, while others argue that it is not permissible, and that such masses are illicit and forbidden to Catholics.

Relationship to sedeprivationism 
A sizeable portion of sedevacantists affirm the Thesis of Cassiciacum of the Dominican theologian Bishop Michel-Louis Guérard des Lauriers as being a valid position, which states that John XXIII and his successors are popes materialiter sed non formaliter, that is, "materially but not formally," and that the post-Vatican II popes will become pope if they recant their heresies. Such position is endorsed by the Istituto Mater Boni Consilii and the Orthodox Roman Catholic Movement.

Demography 
There are estimated to be between several tens of thousands and more than two hundred thousand sedevacantists worldwide, mostly concentrated in the United States, Mexico, Canada, France, the United Kingdom, Italy and Australia, but the actual size of the sedevacantist movement has never been accurately assessed. It remains extremely difficult to establish the size of the movement for a wide range of reasons, such as the fact that not all sedevacantists identify themselves as such, nor do they necessarily adhere to sedevacantist groups or societies.

Early proponents 
Early proponents of sedevacantism include:
 Francis Schuckardt, an American who was part of the Blue Army of Our Lady of Fátima, until he publicly took the position in 1967 that the Holy See was vacant and that the church that had emerged from the Second Vatican Council was no longer the Catholic Church. He founded the Congregation of Mary Immaculate Queen (CMRI).
 Bishop Daniel Q. Brown, an American former Old Catholic bishop who converted to sedevacantism and an associate of Schuckardt.
 Yukio Nemoto, a Japanese who created the sedevacantist group Seibo No Mikuni (Kingdom of Our Lady, 聖母の御国).
 Joaquín Sáenz y Arriaga, a Mexican Jesuit priest and theologian who put forward sedevacantist ideas in his books The New Montinian Church (August 1971) and Sede Vacante (1973). His writings gave rise to the sedevacantist movement in Mexico, led by Sáenz, Moisés Carmona and Adolfo Zamora, priests who formed the Unión Católica Trento (Tridentine Catholic Union).
 Francis E. Fenton, an American priest who was inspired by Sáenz's writings and founded the Orthodox Roman Catholic Movement as an American parallel to the Mexican Unión Católica Trento.
 Michel-Louis Guérard des Lauriers, a French Dominican priest and theologian who developed the Thesis of Cassiciacum in the 1970s.
 Several American priests of the Society of Saint Pius X (SSPX): Daniel Dolan, Anthony Cekada, and Donald Sanborn, reportedly sedevacantists in the 1970s, who were expelled, along with several other priests, by Archbishop Marcel Lefebvre for holding this view. Nine of these priests later founded the Society of Saint Pius V (SSPV) in 1983.
 Gommar DePauw, an American priest and canonist who founded the organization he named Catholic Traditionalist Movement.
 Oswald Baker, an English priest who was a sedevacantist by at least 1982, and reportedly some time prior to that.
 Lucian Pulvermacher, an American missionary priest who left the Roman Catholic Church in 1976 and in 1998 was elected pope of the conclavist "True Catholic Church" with the name of "Pius XIII".

Bishops and holy orders 
Catholic theology holds that any bishop can validly ordain any baptized male to the priesthood, and any priest to the episcopacy, provided that, with the intention to do what the church does, he uses a rite of ordination or consecration considered valid by the Catholic Church.

Sedevacantist bishops

Consecrated before Vatican II 
The only known Catholic bishop consecrated before the Second Vatican Council who publicly became sedevacantist was Vietnamese Archbishop Ngô Đình Thục (consecrated in 1938), former Vicar Apostolic of Vĩnh Long, Vietnam and former Archbishop of Huế, Vietnam.

Bishop Alfredo Méndez-Gonzalez (consecrated in 1960), former Bishop of Arecibo, Puerto Rico, though not a sedevacantist, at least not a public one, associated himself with sedevacantist priests and consecrated a bishop for them.

Thục line bishops
The "Thục line" bishops designates bishops who derive their episcopacy from Archbishop Thục or from bishops of Thục's lineage. Many bishops in the "Thục line" are part of the non-sedevacantist Palmarian Catholic Church; this is due to Thục having consecrated Bishop Clemente Domínguez y Gómez, future head of the Palmarian Church, and the very numerous episcopal consecrations within this organization.

On 7 May 1981, Thục consecrated the sedeprivationist French priest Michel-Louis Guérard des Lauriers as a bishop. Des Lauriers was a French Dominican theologian and a papal advisor.

On 17 October 1981, Thục consecrated the sedevacantist Mexican priests Moisés Carmona and Adolfo Zamora as bishops. Carmona and Zamora had been sedevacantist leaders and propagators in Mexico for many years, and were among the priests who formed the Tridentine Catholic Union.

The Vatican declared Thục ipso facto excommunicated for these consecrations and for his declaration of sedevacantism.

There are many sedevacantist bishops today whose episcopal lineages descend from Archbishop Thuc, either or both through Bishop Guerard des Lauriers and Bishop Moises Carmona.

Méndez-line bishops
On 19 October 1993, in Carlsbad, California, United States, Bishop Méndez-Gonzalez consecrated the sedevacantist Clarence Kelly of the Society of Saint Pius V (SSPV) to the episcopacy. By Méndez's wish, the consecration was kept secret until his death in 1995.

There are two sedevacantist bishops who descend from Bishop Méndez through Bishop Kelly. Both are bishops of the Congregation of Saint Pius V.

Whose lineages derive from earlier movements 
A considerable number of sedevacantist bishops are thought to derive their holy orders from Bishop Carlos Duarte Costa, who in 1945 set up his own independent Brazilian Catholic Apostolic Church. Carlos Duarte Costa was not a sedevacantist, and instead questioned the papacy as an institution: he denied papal Infallibility and rejected the pope's universal jurisdiction. In further contrast to most Catholic traditionalism, Duarte Costa was left-wing.

Groups 
Sedevacantist groups include:
 Congregation of Mary Immaculate Queen (CMRI), formed in 1967. It operates in North America, South America, Europe, and Asia; is based in Omaha, Nebraska, United States; and is headed by Bishop Mark Pivarunas.
 Society of Saint Pius V (SSPV), formed in 1983 when nine American priests of the Society of Saint Pius X split from the organization over a number of issues including using the liturgical reforms implemented under Pope John XXIII. It operates in North America, is based in Oyster Bay Cove, New York, United States, and is headed by Bishop Clarence Kelly.
 Istituto Mater Boni Consilii (Institute of the Mother of Good Counsel; IMBC), formed in 1985 when four Italian priests of the Society of Saint Pius X split from the organization. It holds to the position of sedeprivationism. It operates in Europe and Argentina, and is based in Verrua Savoia, Turin, Italy. Its bishop is Bishop Geert Stuyver.
 Sociedad Sacerdotal Trento (Priestly Society of Trent; SST), formed in 1993 by the priests of the deceased Bishop Moisés Carmona. Its bishop is Bishop Martín Dávila Gandara.
 Roman Catholic Institute (RCI), founded in 1993 by Bishop Donald Sanborn. It consists of Sanborn, his priests, and some of his seminarians, and is based in Brooksville, Florida, United States.
 Most Holy Family Monastery (MHFM), a traditional Catholic monastery in Fillmore, New York.

See also 
 Sedeprivationism
 Conclavism
 Independent Catholicism 
 Integralism
 Traditionalist Catholicism
 Antipope
 List of movements that dispute the legitimacy of a reigning monarch

References

Further reading

Criticism 
 
 
 
 
  (concerning strict sedevacantists as well as conclavists)